Bayan-Ovoo (Mongolian: rich shrine) may refer to:

Mongolia 
Bayan-Ovoo, Bayankhongor, a sum (district) in Bayankhongor Province
Bayan-Ovoo, Khentii, a sum (district) in Khentii Province
Bayan-Ovoo, Ömnögovi, a sum (district) in Ömnögovi Province

China 
, a sum in Darhan Muminggan United Banner, Baotou, Inner Mongolia
, a sum in Dorbod Banner, Ulanqab, Inner Mongolia
Bayan Obo Mining District, a district in Baotou, Inner Mongolia
Bayan Obo mine, a deposit in Baotou, Inner Mongolia
 , a Township in Hoboksar, Tacheng, Xinjiang